Stu Mittleman is an ultradistance running champion, as well as a fitness/running coach and author.

Mittleman set three consecutive American 100-Mile Road Race records in the US National Championships 1980–1982. His fastest 100-Mile Run was 12 hours 56 min . In 1986, he won the 1,000 Mile World Championship and set a new world record by running the distance (1 609.344 kilometers) in 11 days, 20 hours, 36 min. 50 sec. Mittleman set three consecutive American Records in the 6 Day Race, the final one being set in 1985 at the University of Colorado Field House. One record, which still stands: 577.75 miles in 6 days.

In December 2008, Mittleman became the sixth American – the third American male – to be inducted into the American Ultrarunning Hall of Fame.

References

External links
WorldUltrafit Company of Mittleman, based in California.
Basics of Stu's Approach Tony Robbins refers to the "Stu Mittleman method" in the "Ten Day Challenge – Aerobic Power".
Slow Burn. Slow Down, Burn Fat, and Unlock the Energy Within Book, written by Mittleman.
American Ultrarunning Hall of Fame
Stu Mittleman inducted into the American Ultrarunning Hall of Fame

American male ultramarathon runners
Living people
Year of birth missing (living people)